The National Cemetery of the Alleghenies covers  in Cecil Township, Washington County, Pennsylvania approximately  southwest of Pittsburgh.

The cemetery was dedicated on October 9, 2005 by the United States Department of Veterans Affairs' National Cemetery Administration and is one of the newest cemeteries in the National Cemetery system.  The first burials took place on August 15, 2005. It was constructed on farmland and contains a small farm cemetery with graves dating to the late 18th Century. When fully completed, it will provide over 100,000 burial spaces. The cemetery spans  of land and is open to visitors daily from sunrise to sunset.

See also 
 List of Pennsylvania cemeteries

References

External links 

 
 
 
 

United States national cemeteries
Buildings and structures in Washington County, Pennsylvania
Cemeteries in Pennsylvania
Tourist attractions in Washington County, Pennsylvania